The men's 400 metres hurdles event at the 1975 Pan American Games was held in Mexico City on 13 and 14 October.

Medalists

Results

Heats

Final

References

Athletics at the 1975 Pan American Games
1975